Fairmount Township may refer to the following townships in the United States:

 Fairmount Township, Pike County, Illinois
 Fairmount Township, Grant County, Indiana
 Fairmount Township, Butler County, Kansas
 Fairmount Township, New Jersey
 Fairmount Township, Luzerne County, Pennsylvania